Bibojee Group is a Pakistani conglomerate founded by retired military officer Lieutenant General Habibullah Khan Khattak. It is among the major enterprises in Pakistan, incorporating businesses in manufacturing – these are textiles, automotive vehicles and tyres and in insurance and construction industries.

Subsidiaries 
Among its subsidiaries is Ghandhara Industries Limited, a major automotive vehicles assembly plant operation in Pakistan. Ghandhara Industries is an affiliate company of Ghandhara Nissan. These two entities own shares in each other. Ghandhara Nissan is also part-owned by the Bibojee Group. The Bibojee Group is also the controlling shareholder of General Tyre Pakistan, the nation's major truck and automobile tyre manufacturer. 

The Universal Insurance Company Ltd. is one of Pakistan's major diversified insurance carriers. Gammon Pakistan is one of Pakistan's large enterprises in the field of heavy construction and engineering.

Group Executives
Habibullah Khan Khattak
Ali Kuli Khan Khattak
Gohar Ayub Khan

References

External links
Bibojee Group Home Page

Conglomerate companies of Pakistan
Conglomerate companies established in 1953